Bourne Cricket Club, is an amateur cricket club based in Bourne, Lincolnshire, England. Bourn's 1st XI Team play in the ECB Lincolnshire County Board Premier League, the 2nd XI compete in the South Lincs & Border League. Bourne also field a Sunday XI team in the Rutland and District Cricket League, a Women's team in the East Midlands Women’s Cricket League, and they have an established Junior Section, who play in The Border County Cricket Association.

Ground
Bourn's ground is at Abbey Lawn, and the current groundsman is David Christmas, who has captained Lincolnshire and played England amateur cricket. The ground's highest score is 270* and was set by Peter Morgan (Bourne); the highest partnership is 356 (Between Spinks 207* Fotheringham 119* and 30 extras), with the best bowling figures 9-28 set by Mark Dixon against Hartsholme CC in 2010.

History
Bourne have been League Champions six times since the Premier League was founded in 2000; winning it in 2000, 2001, 2002, 2010, 2014 and 2021. 2011 saw a hard-fought season brought down to the Bracebridge v Bourne winner takes all penultimate game, which Bourne lost, losing the league by 18 points. Fahad Masood, Pakistani International also managed to break the league wicket taking record, by 18 wickets.

The club has played host to Rotary International fixtures, county games, the Lord's Taverners and Nottinghamshire. In the past 50 years the club has been a victim to arson on two occasions. On one occasion, before a Hodgkinson Cup 6's tournament, after which the tournament went ahead being based in a mobile office.

The club has created professionals Luke Wright (Leicestershire, Sussex and England), Andy Afford (Nottinghamshire and England) and Richard Bates (Nottinghamshire and England women's coach who became world champions), and Joey Evison (Nottinghamshire and England u19s).

References

English club cricket teams
1803 establishments in England
Bourne, Lincolnshire
Cricket in Lincolnshire